The Zhengzhou–Shenzhen high-speed train are high-speed train services between Zhengzhou, the capital city of Henan Province, and Shenzhen, a major city in Guangdong Province.

History
The service commenced operations on 28 September 2012, when the Zhengzhou–Wuhan section of the Beijing–Guangzhou–Shenzhen–Hong Kong HSR was put into operation.

Operations
The services are operated on the Beijing–Guangzhou–Shenzhen–Hong Kong HSR and Zhengzhou–Jiaozuo ICR (G75 only).

These trainsets go back to Zhengzhou East respectively as G76 and G74.

Note:
●: stop at the station
↓ or ↑: pass the station
—: out of service range

Rolling stocks
The services are operated by CRH380AL trainsets.

CRH380AL
The G75/G74 service is operated by 16-car CRH380AL trainsets of CR Zhengzhou while the G76/G73 service uses the same type of trainsets of CR Guangzhou. The front and rear cars (Car 1 and 16) are for business seats together with 2+2 first class seats. Car 2-3 are first class car with 2+2 seating. Car 4-8 and 10-15 are for second class seats with 3+2 seating. Car 9 is the dining car.

Previously rolling stocks used by G76/G73 (in chronological order)
 CRH3C
 CRH380B
 CRH380A

Other services
The services between Shenzhen and Beijing (G71/72), Shijiazhuang (G531/532), Jinan (G279/280) and Xi'an (G817/818/821/822/825/826/839/840), and between Beijing and Hong Kong (G79/80), also provide services between Zhengzhou and Shenzhen.

References

China Railway passenger services
Passenger rail transport in China
Railway services introduced in 2012